John Michael Schaefer (born March 25, 1938) is an American politician and former perennial candidate who served on the San Diego City Council from 1965 to 1971 and then ran for 33 local and state offices in California, Arizona, Maryland, and Nevada for nearly half a century before unexpectedly winning election to the California Board of Equalization in 2018. Schaefer is the oldest Californian to serve in a state constitutional office.

Early life and education

John Michael Schaefer was born in San Diego, California on March 25, 1938. He graduated from Mission Bay High School in 1956, and earned a Bachelor of Business from the University of California, Berkeley and a Juris Doctor from the Georgetown University Law Center.

Career 
During the 1960 presidential election, he supported U.S. Senator John F. Kennedy and later served as a staff assistant for state Senator Thomas Kuche. He also worked as an analyst for the U.S. Securities and Exchange Commission.

In 1965, Schaefer was elected to the San Diego City Council and served until 1971. In 1968, he received the Republican nomination in California's 37th House district, but was defeated by incumbent Representative Lionel Van Deerlin. In 1971, he ran for mayor in the open primary, but received less than one percent of the vote. In 1974, he ran for the Republican nomination for Secretary of State in Nevada, but was defeated by Stanley W. Paher.

In the 1980s, he moved to Maryland where he befriended William Donald Schaefer, who served as the Mayor of Baltimore and Governor of Maryland, and Mike Schaefer believed that sharing a last name with him would help him politically and following Schaefer's death in 2011 Mike filed a $28,000 claim to William's estate. In 1986, he ran for the Republican nomination for Maryland's Senate election, but was defeated by Linda Chavez.

From the 1990s to the 2010s, he ran for local offices in Los Angeles and San Francisco, Secretary of State of California, state legislative seats in Arizona, Nevada, and Maryland, and mayor in Baltimore and Palm Springs. In 2014, he was removed from the Nevada state controller primary and the decision was upheld by the Nevada Supreme Court as he had failed to meet the residency requirements.

In 2018, he initially sought to run for California's 54th State Assembly district, but later dropped out as he would rather remain in San Diego and ran in the Board of Equalization's 4th district. He ran as a member of the Democratic party and placed second in the top-two primary behind state senator Joel Anderson. On November 6, 2018, Schaefer unexpectedly defeated Anderson by a narrow margin, who had spent over $300,000 to Schaefer's $25,000. This was attributed to the Democratic wave and Anderson being reprimanded for his comments to a female lobbyist.

Legal issues

In 1970, he was arrested for bribery and conspiracies charges in the 1970 Yellow Cab bribery scandal, but was later acquitted after an eleven-hour deliberation by a jury on January 21, 1971.

Schaefer bought properties in multiple states, including the Schaefer Hotel which he bought for $450,000, and he was successfully sued by his tenants in Los Angeles for the low quality of his housing and they were awarded $1.83 million.

In 1993, he was convicted of misdemeanor spousal abuse and was later disbarred by the Nevada Supreme Court in 2001. In 2015, he was ordered to pay $328 to his live-in landlord.

In 2013, comedian Brad Garrett filed a restraining order against Schaefer, stating in his application: "As a celebrity, I am very concerned about stalkers who seek notoriety by associating themselves with me." Under the order, Schaefer is also banned from the MGM Grand Las Vegas.

Electoral history

References

1938 births
Living people
San Diego City Council members
California Democrats
California politicians convicted of crimes
California Republicans
Maryland Republicans
Nevada Democrats
Nevada Republicans
American landlords